Hsu Ming-yuan is a Taiwanese politician. He currently serves as the Deputy Minister of the Council of Indigenous Peoples of the Executive Yuan.

See also
 Taiwanese aborigines

References

Political office-holders in the Republic of China on Taiwan
Living people
Year of birth missing (living people)
National Chengchi University alumni
Soochow University (Taiwan) alumni